Jan Štěkna (died c. 1407) was a Czech Cistercian who lived in the 14th–15th centuries and served as the pastor of Jadwiga of Poland.

Life
Štěkna studied at Charles University, becoming a baccalarius in liberal arts in 1373 and a master's in 1391; he also received a bachelor's in theology (1391), as well as a master's (1403) In 1393 he preached at the Bethlehem Chapel, and he would later oppose the Hussite movement.

Štěkna moved to Cracow through the influence of Matthew of Kraków. He taught in the theology faculty of the University of Cracow until his death around 1407.

Works
 Carcer anime; Sermo ad populum factus apud Carmelitas contra Wikleff contra remanenciam panis. Vienna, ÖNB 4314, f. 135b.
 Collecta ex dictis diversorum doctorum contra Ioh. Wikleff et contra tractatum de corpore Christi Stanikonis et alium tractatum Ioh. Hus, qui ponunt remanenciam panis in sacramento altaris. Vienna, ÖNB 4314, f. 136a.
 Sermones.

References

Notes

Bibliography
 Bartoš, F.M. Husův učitel Dr. J. Š. a Kaple Betlémská. Věstník ČAV, 1949.
 Bartoš, F.M. Dvě studie o husitských postilách. 1955.
 Siemiątkowska, Zofia. "Jan Szczekna." Materiały i Studia Zakładu Historii Filozofii Starożytnej i Średniowiecznej, Seria A: Materiały Do Historii Filozofii Średniowiecznej W Polsce 5 (1965): 34-75.
 
 Tříška, J. Literární činnost. 1967.
 Tříška, J. Životopisný slovník. 1981.

Polish Cistercians
14th-century Polish people
15th-century Polish people
Year of birth unknown
Year of death uncertain
1407 deaths
Charles University alumni
Academic staff of Jagiellonian University